Below the Deadline is a 1936 American film directed by Charles Lamont.

Cast
Cecilia Parker as Molly Fitzgerald
Russell Hopton as Terry Mulvaney
Theodore von Eltz as Flash Ackroyd
Thomas E. Jackson as Pearson
Warner Richmond as Diamond Dutch
John St. Polis as Mr. Abrams
Kathryn Sheldon as Aunt Mary Tibbett
Robert Homans as Police Captain Symonds
Jack Gardner as Henchman Spike
Al Thompson as Sparring Partner Al
Charles Delaney as Artie Nolan
Sidney Payne as Plastic Surgeon
Edward Hearn as Guard Peters

Home media
On October 27, 2009, Alpha Video released Below the Deadline on Region 0 DVD.

References

External links

1936 films
American black-and-white films
1936 crime drama films
Films directed by Charles Lamont
1936 romantic drama films
American romantic drama films
Chesterfield Pictures films
American crime drama films
1930s English-language films
1930s American films